Yvette Brackman (born 1967, New York City, New York, United States) is a Danish American artist based in Copenhagen, Denmark.

She works in a variety of media from sculpture, video and installations to social interventions and systems. Her work has a performative quality and uses methods such as role-play, memory, staging and exchange.

Exploring the position of storytelling in social relations her projects often draw on elements from fashion, theatre and design and use strategies that challenge the role of the viewer. She explores themes such as the relationship of the body to space and memory and the interplay between origin, surroundings, displacement and exile. Recurring themes in her work include cultural survival and adaptability as well as political systems and their effects.

She has an MFA, MA and certificate in Woman's Studies from the University of Illinois in Chicago's School of Art and Design and a BFA from The School of The Art Institute of Chicago. She was Professor and Head of Department in The School of Walls and Space at the Royal Danish Art Academy from 2000-2007.           She has been guest professor, visiting lecturer and Phd. advisor at numerous institutions in Scandinavia and the USA. She has exhibited internationally since 1993, has curated several exhibitions since 1995 and has published widely in art periodicals and journals.

In 2012 JR Ringier published “Yvette Brackman: Systems and Scenarios”  a monograph about the artist's work.

Her recent exhibitions include The North Coast Art Triennial 2016, Denmark. Overgaden Center for Contemporary Art, 2015, Denmark. The Moscow Biennial 2013, Russia. The Liverpool Biennial, 2012, England. Freies Museum Berlin, 2013, Germany. LAXART, 2012, Los Angeles CA. Museum of Contemporary Art, 2012, Denmark and in "x-rummet" at the Danish National Gallery in Copenhagen 2002, where her work is also part of the permanent collection.

References 
Artbook.com
Information.dk
Freies Museum Berlin

External links 
 Yvette Brackman's website
 Yvette Brackman on Louisiana Channel, A Sense of Togetherness
 Yvette Brackman on Yale University Radio WYBCX
 Yvette Brackman on kvinfo.dk, Hun nebryder mure på Kunstakademiet
 Monograph, Systems and Scenarios, Jrp Ringier, 2012
 Yvette Brackman, Sibirien i Sølvgade, Dagbladet Information, 2001
 Yvette Brackman, Historiens stof, Dagbladet Information, 2014
 Yvette Brackman, Summer Encounters, The New Yorker, 2015
 Yvette Brackman, LAXART, Los Angeles, USA
 Yvette Brackman, Sort Mælk - Holocaust i ny kunst, Museet for Samtidskunst, Roskilde, Denmark
 Yvette Brackman, Statens Museum for Kunst, X-Rummet, 2002
 Yvette Brackman, Nordkystens Kunsttriennale 2016
 Yvette Brackman, Liverpool Biennial 2012, City States

Danish artists
Artists from New York City
1967 births
Living people